American Horror Story: Hotel is the fifth season of the FX horror anthology series American Horror Story. The season's theme is addiction and revolves around the Hotel Cortez, a mysterious Los Angeles hotel owned by a bloodsucking fashionista named The Countess. An anonymous tip regarding a serial killer who murders people in accordance to the Ten Commandments points John Lowe, a detective haunted by the abduction of his son, to Room 64 of the Cortez.

Veteran cast members include Wes Bentley, Kathy Bates, Chloë Sevigny, Denis O'Hare, Evan Peters, Sarah Paulson, Matt Bomer, and Angela Bassett, with Lady Gaga and Cheyenne Jackson making their series debuts. Special guest stars include Naomi Campbell. Veteran cast members with recurring appearances include Mare Winningham, Lily Rabe, Matt Ross, Finn Wittrock, Christine Estabrook, John Carroll Lynch, and Anthony Ruivivar. This is the second season that is not strictly anthological, with Christine Estabrook, and Matt Ross reprising their previous roles as Marcy (Murder House) and Charles Montgomery (Murder House) respectively, and Gabourey Sidibe reprising her role as Queenie from Coven. Paulson herself also reprises her previous character from Murder House (Billie Dean Howard). This is the first season not to feature mainstay Jessica Lange. This is also the first season not to feature Frances Conroy in any capacity.

Cast members

Main cast
 Kathy Bates as Iris
 Sarah Paulson as Sally McKenna and Billie Dean Howard
 Evan Peters as James Patrick March
 Wes Bentley as Det. John Lowe
 Matt Bomer as Donovan
 Chloë Sevigny as Dr. Alex Lowe
 Denis O'Hare as Liz Taylor
 Cheyenne Jackson as Will Drake
 Angela Bassett as Ramona Royale
 Lady Gaga as Elizabeth Johnson / the Countess

Supporting cast

Characters

Main characters

Iris
Iris (portrayed by Kathy Bates) is the manager of the Hotel Cortez who works at the reception desk and is often seen doing crossword puzzles. Despite hating the hotel, she remains to stay close to her son Donovan, who despises her after she divorced his father and became involved in a breatharian cult which prevented her from providing him medical care. She remains protective of him, pushing Sally McKenna out of a window of the hotel's seventh floor in 1994 after she supplied him with China White heroin, which killed him. Since then, Iris and Donovan have maintained an ongoing rivalry. After Donovan rejects her in a heated confrontation, Iris asks Sally to help her commit suicide, but a damaged Donovan revives Iris by infecting her with the blood virus.

Iris initially rejects killing, but is driven to it when her craving for blood takes a physical toll. She teams up with Donovan and Ramona Royale to kill The Countess out of revenge, despite her initial loyalty to the Countess. She begins killing guests and detoxing them so she may serve their blood to The Countess, and her relationship with Donovan begins to improve as he enjoys his mother's more murderous and reckless behavior. Their relationship deteriorates when Donovan reunites with The Countess and calls off the truce between the trio. Iris warns him of his impending downfall, to which Ramona testifies. Iris plans on committing suicide with her friend Liz Taylor, but decides to enact revenge on The Countess and gain control of the hotel. They go into The Countess's penthouse, guns blazing, fatally wounding Donovan and injuring The Countess. The Countess escapes when Iris refuses Liz Taylor's plea to find her and runs to Donovan's aid. Donovan says it's too late for him and as a dying wish, he asks her to take him off the hotel's premises so his spirit will not be stuck there. They succeed, and Donovan dies in the street, telling Iris, "I love you, Mom."

Following the death of The Countess (who is killed by John), Iris and Liz become the new managers of the Hotel Cortez. Some of the ghosts continue their murderous activities, but Iris and Liz eventually strike a deal with them and James March to stop killing the guests so that the hotel can be declared a historical landmark hotel in 2026 and stay in business. Iris also makes amends with Sally's spirit by purchasing her an iPhone as a present, allowing her to become a social media star. Iris agrees to help Liz contact the missing spirit of Tristan with the help of psychic Billie Dean Howard. Billie contacts a spirit who they first believe to be Tristan but Billie tells them it is Donovan. Despite Donovan's spirit not residing in the hotel (since he died off the premises), he passes on a message for Iris through Billie that he is finally living a happy life in the afterlife and that he loves her, which brings joyful tears to her eyes.

For her performance, Bates was nominated for the Critics' Choice Television Award for Best Actress in a Movie/Miniseries and the Primetime Emmy Award for Outstanding Supporting Actress in a Limited Series or a Movie.

Sally McKenna
Sally McKenna (portrayed by Sarah Paulson), also known as Hypodermic Sally, is a drug addict who killed Iris's son by overdosing. Sally died on the Hotel Cortez property in 1994 when Iris shoved her out of a hotel window and she plummeted seven stories to her death. She has since resided in the hotel and considers it her home, unable to leave, maintaining a rivalry with Iris. She follows drug addicts like Gabriel around the hotel and uses The Addiction Demon to punish them for their addiction. She sews all of her victims into the mattresses of the hotel, one of which was found in Vendela and Agnetha's bed. She is constantly seen taunting John, believing they're destined to be lovers. She and James March have an agreement to share John, allowing James to let John be a buffer for the remaining Commandment Killings in exchange for James' protection from the Addiction Demon. As John realizes he is the killer, he and Sally begin to bond, but he quickly leaves her for Alex, Sally vows to kill him for abandoning her. After John's death, Sally is initially depressed and feels her life now has no purpose. However, after Iris gives her an iPhone to make amends for killing her, Iris tells her to get on social media, and she finally finds new meaning in life by becoming a social media star.

For her performance, Paulson was nominated for the Critics' Choice Television Award for Best Supporting Actress in a Movie/Miniseries and the Primetime Emmy Award for Outstanding Supporting Actress in a Limited Series or a Movie.

James Patrick March
James Patrick March (portrayed by Evan Peters), sometimes referred to as Jimmy or Mr. March, is a wealthy oil businessman and serial killer, who used his money to construct the Hotel Cortez in the late 1920s and built it to serve his need to kill by incorporating secret shafts and dead-end hallways to hide the victims of his murders. He is helped in this task by his loyal servant and hotel laundress Hazel Evers. James' father was militantly religious and implied to be abusive toward young James, resulting in his resentment of religion and God. After murdering a victim who was religious, James decides to commit a series of murders based on the Ten Commandments, murdering people who broke said commandments and posthumously harvesting a body part from each.

He first met The Countess at the opening of the Cortez when he prevented her from committing suicide in the wake of Rudolph Valentino's alleged death. The two married at the Cortez, but James had had unreciprocated feelings of affection toward the Countess. When The Countess resumed her polyamorous relationship with Rudolph and his wife Natacha Rambova, he abducts them and encloses them in a dead-end hallway, where they remain for the next 90 years. The Countess initially encourages him to use his murderous habits in a progressive manner, killing people in order to get money. However, James believes she eventually turns him in to the police so that she can gain control of the hotel and his wealth. He kills himself in his office at 2:25 AM before the police are able to arrest him. His office is later converted into Room 64, where the clock's alarm goes off at 2:25 AM every morning. After his death, he and The Countess come to an arrangement where the couple must have dinner together one night every month. He recruits Det. John Lowe as his successor to complete the remaining eight Commandment Killings upon seeing John's rage, claiming he is better than killers such as Jeffrey Dahmer and John Wayne Gacy. The Countess continues to reject him, but, due to her "immense beauty," he always forgives her. He shows The Countess's new husband Will Drake her only biological son (and likely James' as well), Bartholomew. Will insults the child and The Countess kills Will in a fit of rage. James later kills Queenie for Ramona, then asks Ramona to kill The Countess so her ghost can spend eternity with him in the hotel. She is unsuccessful, but The Countess is later shot dead by John. Her ghost then successfully stays in the hotel. James expresses his pride for John, meaning their work is now complete.

He arranges to have a dinner party with The Countess, where he tells her that he forgives her for turning him in to police, however, she says she was not the one who turned him in. Hazel Evers admits to turning him in, because she was in love with James and wanted the two of them to be killed by police so they would spend eternity together. In response, James banishes her from his service. James later then makes an agreement with the ghosts of the Cortez to stop killing the guests so in a year the hotel can be made a historic landmark where they can stay forever. He hosts a "Devil's Night" soirée every year where dead serial killers whom he personally mentored come to celebrate each other on their murders, including one in the episode "Devil's Night" for John, and the one in "Be Our Guest" for when he and the serial killer ghosts hold Billie Dean Howard for ransom so that no one will ever film another documentary in the hotel. He is notable for his unique and bizarre Boston Brahmin accent. Being much older than most other dead and every alive resident of the Hotel Cortez, he occasionally struggles to adapt to modern life such as referring to cocaine as "Bolivian marching powder" and mistaking Colonel Sanders for a military persona with a rather odd preference for poultry.

James March returns in the eighth season, Apocalypse, where he is seen playing cards with Queenie after killing her. When he encounters Cordelia Goode, the supreme witch, who comes to rescue Queenie, March does not attempt to stop her, and encourages Queenie to leave with Cordelia to have another shot at life. Cordelia was unsuccessful to save her, much to March's joy. When Michael Langdon, the antichrist, arrives to save Queenie, he does the same with him. After Langdon and Queenie leave the room, he sadly recollects the playing cards knowing that she will not return, saying "Solitaire it is."

For his performance in Hotel, Peters was nominated for the Fangoria Chainsaw Award for Best TV Supporting Actor.

Det. John Lowe
Det. John Lowe (portrayed by Wes Bentley) is a Los Angeles homicide detective, husband of Alex Lowe, and father of Scarlett and Holden. Holden was kidnapped five years ago at a carnival in Santa Monica, an incident which severely damaged John and Alex's marriage. John is investigating a series of murders happening in Los Angeles. He receives a phone call that he finds to be originating from Room 64 of the Hotel Cortez. When he goes there to investigate, he finds the room empty. He receives a text from Alex with an address, asking for help. When he arrives at the house, twin boys are found murdered and disemboweled. He realizes the perpetrator hacked Alex's phone and leaves the house, fearing his presence there will endanger Alex and Scarlett, and checks into Room 64 of the Hotel. During his stay, he sees what he believes are hallucinations of his lost son Holden, though apparently the same age as he was when he was abducted. He learns about the origins of the hotel from Iris, and learns that the murders he is investigating may be connected to the late James March and the Ten Commandments. John, due to his addiction to alcohol, is targeted by Sally, believing that he is her destined lover. He rejects her advances, as he is still faithful to his wife. But when he discovers that his wife has gone behind his back and reunited with their son Holden, John embraces Sally.

He suffers from long periods of unconsciousness, which Sally explains is the result of him drinking and being recruited by James March to complete the series of murders he started, and that he has been the one committing the Ten Commandment Killings. When he confesses this to his partner Andrew Hahn, he tells John that is impossible, since the murders started months before he checked into the hotel. John then regains his memory of going to the Blue Parrot Lounge, the bar at the hotel, for drinks in 2010 after working on a case where a father committed suicide upon finding his entire family dead. Donovan takes him to James, who deems him a worthy successor and successfully convinces him over two days that the world no longer gives justice to those who he believes deserve it. He remembers being convinced to take the lead on the case and killing each of the victims he has been investigating. He kills Andrew when he discovers he has been having coffee with Alex, citing the commandment "Thou shalt not covet." John reunites with Alex and helps her halt a blood virus outbreak by killing The Countess and completing James's collection. In return, James releases John's family, whom he had been holding hostage over breaking his promise. He decides to reunite his family and takes them home initially, providing blood for his wife and son, but they later decide to return to the hotel, feeling that it is their true home and they send Scarlett away to boarding school to keep her safe. After killing a man in an alley and draining his blood for Alex and Holden, he is gunned down by the police before he is able to re-enter the hotel. As a result, John can only visit his family once a year on Devil's Night at Halloween. In the finale "Be Our Guest" he and James frighten away Billie Dean Howard and he visits his family in the hotel, including a now teenaged Scarlett.

For his performance, Bentley was nominated for the Critics' Choice Television Award for Best Actor in a Movie/Miniseries.

Donovan
Donovan (portrayed by Matt Bomer) is the former partner of The Countess, and she revived him from dying from a heroin overdose by infecting him with the blood virus. Since then, he has vowed to stay away from drugs. The Countess values "the hunt," where she tracks down the proper people to kill and consume their blood, while Donovan values domesticity, and would rather stay home. This bores the thrill-seeking Countess, and she seeks romance with the more exciting Tristan Duffy and abandons Donovan. Hurt, he teams up with Ramona Royale and his mother, Iris, with whom he has a difficult relationship, to murder the Countess as revenge for what she's done to the three of them. However, he still feels affection for The Countess, and he gets cold feet when he and Ramona arrive at the hotel to kill the children. Instead, he returns to the penthouse and smells The Countess's clothing.

In Episode 8, it is revealed that Donovan introduced John to James so John could become James' successor in the killings. After The Countess kills Tristan, she and Donovan reunite, and he disbands the truce between him, Ramona, and Iris, and traps Ramona in an enclosed hallway. Donovan begins doubting Elizabeth's affection toward him when he sees her kiss Rudolph Valentino, a past lover of hers. He responds by killing Rudolph and disfiguring his face. The Countess, although upset, views this as an act of love, and they reunite again, only for Iris and Liz to burst in and begin firing at them. Both The Countess and Donovan are shot, and he makes one last request to Liz and Iris to drag his body out of the hotel so his ghost will not return on the property. He dies on the road outside the Cortez and his last dying words are to Iris is that he loves her. When Liz and Iris use psychic Bille Dean Howard to initially contact Tristan for Liz, she manages to contact Donovan's spirit instead, and he gives Billie a message for Iris telling her he is finally happy in the afterlife and that he loves his mother.

Dr. Alex Lowe
Dr. Alex Lowe (portrayed by Chloë Sevigny) is John's wife. She becomes estranged from him after the abduction of their son Holden. She makes at least one suicide attempt since his disappearance, citing that she has grown closer to Holden than she has to Scarlett or John. She is a pediatrician employed by Mrs. Ellison, a West Hollywood anti-vaxxer mother, to treat her son Max, who has been infected with the measles. When she visits a drunken John at the hotel to drop off divorce papers, she is shocked to see Holden in the hotel hall, and she brings him back home. However, Holden insists that she bring him back to the hotel so he can see his "other mommy". She interrogates The Countess about Holden and why he hasn't aged since his abduction, and she learns about the ancient blood virus with which The Countess has infected the children. Benefits include eternal youth and immortality, although they are able to be killed by unconventional methods, and a thirst for blood. The Countess then infects Alex at her request so that she may remain with Holden forever. When Max is admitted into the hospital where his conditions worsens, Alex infects him with the blood virus to save him, but this results in him killing his parents, teacher, principal, and several school nurses in order to consume their blood, as well as spreading the measles to his friends.

Later, John discovers them and Alex enlists the help of Liz to destroy any evidence of her being there. She convinces John that he is spiraling into insanity, and that the hotel is only aiding his departure from reality. After hearing about a series of killings in which adults have their blood drained, The Countess sends Alex on a mission to contain the outbreak, threatening to kill her and Holden if she does not. After convincing the children to come back to the hotel, she and John trap the group of children in the enclosed hallway with a blood-thirsty Ramona. She and John reunite and take Holden home, while a heartbroken Sally vows to kill John. However, she returns with her family to the hotel, deciding it is their true home after being temporarily held captive there by James for John. John provides for Alex and Holden's bloodthirst by killing people, but he is then killed. Following her husband's death, his ghost visits her, Holden and Scarlett every year on "Devil's Night" in the Hotel Cortez.

Liz Taylor
Liz Taylor (portrayed by Denis O'Hare) is the eccentric, transgender bartender of the Blue Parrot Lounge and long-time employee of the hotel. Formerly known as Nick Pryor, Liz worked as a medical representative up until 1984, and was in an unhappy marriage to a woman named Tracy, with two kids, toward whom she displayed no affection. While on a business trip in Los Angeles, she meets The Countess in her hotel room while dressing up in her wife's clothes. The Countess does her make-up in a style similar to her namesake, Elizabeth Taylor, and dubs her Liz Taylor. The Countess suggests that they go out so Liz can feel like her true self, but fearful of the reaction, the two settle on Liz taking a walk down the hallway. While doing so, Liz encounters her two coworkers (also on the business trip), who threaten to expose her while hurling homophobic slurs. Fearful that they may hurt Liz, The Countess slits their throats in front of Liz and persuades Liz to pursue her true self at the Cortez. Liz quits her job and breaks off her marriage, sending money to her kids every month.

It is revealed in "Room Service" that, although she was very close to The Countess, she was never infected with the blood virus. Liz becomes enamored with The Countess's new flame, Tristan Duffy. When the two confront Elizabeth about their love for each other, The Countess says that Liz may have Tristan, moments before slitting his throat in front of her. In "Room 33," it is revealed that she is very close with The Countess's ex-girlfriend Ramona Royale. Since then, Liz has scrapped all loyalty to The Countess, even making a vain attempt to stop her wedding to Will. Liz plans on killing herself, but has second thoughts when her son, Douglas Pryor, finds her and asks her to rejoin his life, even welcoming her as a grandparent to his newborn child. She then decides to team up with Iris and take over the hotel and kill The Countess. After The Countess is finally killed, Liz and Iris manage to fix up the hotel to keep the business alive. When Liz learns she has cancer, she allows The Countess to kill her to remain in the hotel as a ghost. After her revival as a ghost, Liz is finally reunited with Tristan after unsuccessfully trying to contact him before. When Tristan appears in her room, Liz asks why he did not seek contact her. Tristan tells her he did not wish to interfere with her life as a living being, and the two embrace knowing that they will spend eternity in the hotel together as ghosts.

Will Drake
Will Drake (portrayed by Cheyenne Jackson) is the recent buyer and new owner of the Hotel Cortez. Similar to Liz, he loves art and fashion, formerly living in New York City as a fashion mogul, but moves to Los Angeles with his son Lachlan after he felt that "the pulse" of the city was gone. Will is initially thought to be gay, but he later identifies himself as bisexual. He plans to knock down and renovate the hotel which upsets the residents, most of all Donovan who does not take kindly to Will's arrival. Will begins a relationship with The Countess, and later marries her in the hotel lobby. He has construction workers knock down a concrete wall which held The Countess's past lovers, Rudolph Valentino and Natacha Rambova, unleashing them. He celebrates his marriage at the Blue Parrot Lounge, where he meets James March, who brings him to Room 33. Will is disgusted by the hideous appearance of The Countess's only child, Bartholomew. Although The Countess planned to murder him after they married, she bumps up her murder plan and locks him away in the enclosed hallway with a weakened and bloodthirsty Ramona Royale, who tricks Will into unlocking her cage, allowing her to slit his throat and consume his blood as The Countess watches from a monitor in her room. He is revived as a ghost and he resents The Countess for killing him, and interrupts her filing a police report for his disappearance. He accuses her of killing him for his money, but she tells him she is Lachlan's legal guardian and will inherit his wealth once he reaches the age 18. Following his death, his business empire liquidates and his vast savings become worthless. Feeling without meaning following his economic collapse, he sets out with Sally in murdering the hotel guests. However, Liz convinces him to revive his fashion career, and with her help, he establishes a new fashion company and holds fashion shows in the hotel lobby with the ghosts and vampires of the hotel appearing as catwalk models, allowing him to continue building his fame and success in death.

Ramona Royale
Ramona Royale (portrayed by Angela Bassett) is a well-known actress and The Countess's ex-lover. She was an actress who did many TV commercials and movies during the 1970s, when she had a lesbian relationship with The Countess. Later, in the 1990s, Ramona witnesses The Countess killing her boyfriend. After her boyfriend's death, her acting career ultimately fails and she moves into her parents' house to care for her mother, who has cancer, and her father, who has Alzheimer's. After her mother dies of cancer, a group of robbers break into the house and kill her father. She resurrects him with her blood virus, but he then goes on a killing spree, which ultimately leads her to drown him in the bathtub, killing him. She is introduced in "Mommy" and plans to get revenge on The Countess for her boyfriend's murder. She plans to stab The Countess in her sleep in "She Wants Revenge" but Donovan ends up betraying her by tazing her. While unconscious, The Countess and Donovan put Ramona in one of the neon cages in the sealed hallway alongside Will Drake. Will eventually releases himself and while attempting to free Ramona, she slits his throat and drinks his blood while The Countess watches via cameras.

Ramona kills the infected children after John and Alex lure them to her, though she is ill by the time Liz and Iris find her. Liz and Iris give her Queenie and she drinks her blood, then James kills Queenie. James asks Ramona to kill The Countess for him. She goes into The Countess's room to kill her, but is unsuccessful after The Countess seduces her and they have sex. Ramona later participates in Will Drake's fashion show and Liz tells her that she is dying. In the finale, Ramona joins "Devil's Night" and assists in torturing Billie Dean Howard, who flees the Cortez, after threatening to hunt her down and kill her should she ever make another live show in the hotel on Devil's Night. For her performance, Bassett was nominated for the NAACP Image Award for Outstanding Actress in a Television Movie, Mini-Series or Dramatic Special.

The Countess

The Countess (portrayed by Lady Gaga), is the enigmatic, bloodsucking, malevolent owner of the Hotel Cortez and resides in the penthouse. Born Elizabeth Johnson in 1904, she was an actress who was featured in a Rudolph Valentino movie and later invited to dinner at his house. That night, she met his wife Natacha Rambova who indicates that their divorce was just a publicity stunt. She then engages in a secret love triangle with Rudolph and Natacha. While attending a cocktail party celebrating the opening of the Hotel Cortez, she heard about Valentino's death in New York and planned to commit suicide by jumping out a window. She is saved by James Patrick March whom she later marries, but doesn't profess to love. Even during her marriage, she frequently disguises herself and visits Valentino's coffin, leaving a single red rose each time. On one such visit, she finds Valentino and his wife alive, and they state that they are infected with a blood virus that saved them from death. They then turn Elizabeth so she can spend eternity with her true loves while her disappointed husband watches from afar. After hearing about her secret love affair with the Valentinos, James gets his revenge by trapping the couple in the sealed hallways of the hotel. This damages her relationship with Natacha, who believes that Elizabeth is the one who trapped her. After discovering what James has done, Elizabeth becomes even more angry and hates him even more. In 1994, she turns Donovan, who was dying of a heroin overdose given to him by Hypodermic Sally. For the last 20 years until the time setting of the series, he has been her partner and paramour, but after meeting Tristan Duffy, she dumps him. She also marries newcomer Will Drake, whom she plans to kill and steal his fortune. In the 70s, she had a relationship with Ramona Royale which lasted until the 90s when Elizabeth shot Ramona's boyfriend, Prophet Moses, in revenge. She is obsessed with fashion and hates betrayal, especially infidelity, which causes her to kill Tristan after he professes his love for Liz Taylor. In spite of her hatred of betrayal, she herself indulges in as many lovers as she wishes.  She then reunites with Donovan, but he is crushed a second time after she professes her love for Valentino. After Donovan jealously kills Valentino, he and Elizabeth reunite again. After this reconciliation, Liz and Iris burst into the penthouse shooting at them. Donovan leaps in front of Elizabeth, is shot and dies outside the Hotel Cortez. The Countess is injured in the shooting and helped by Sally, who vows to never leave her. She is then confronted by Ramona, but while attempting to enter the elevator, John appears and shoots her five times and she dies. Her head is placed on the Ten Commandments Killer's "Thou Shall Not Commit Murder" marker but she is resurrected as a ghost and spends eternity with her husband James March. He thanks her for turning him in to the police and forgives her, but Hazel Evers confesses that she is the one who actually turned in March. The Countess begins to cry while realizing that she's living in a personal nightmare: spending the rest of her days with a person she doesn't love. She later appears when Liz announces her battle with prostate cancer, and mercifully slits Liz's throat using her chainmail glove. In the last moments of the season, The Countess is at the bar at 2:25 AM, and meets a guest who says he's awaiting some friends. She comments, "You have a jawline for days" (which she had previously said about Donovan) before the episode ends, revealing that she has found herself a new lover in Donovan's image. For her performance, Gaga won the Golden Globe Award for Best Actress - Miniseries or Television Film and was nominated for the People's Choice Award for Favorite Sci-Fi/Fantasy TV Actress, the Fangoria Chainsaw Award for Best TV Actress, and the Satellite Award for Best Actress - Television Series Drama.

Supporting characters
 Hazel Evers (portrayed by Mare Winningham) is the eccentric laundress and maid of Hotel Cortez and loyal servant to James March. She is a ghost who resides in the hotel and cleans up after The Countess and James's murders. She killed herself in the hotel with James when they were found by the police. Her son, Albert, was kidnapped by Gordon Northcott and was a victim of the Wineville Chicken Coop Murders in the 1920s, causing her to become distraught every Halloween. She is not very fond of The Countess, even trying to dissuade Will from marrying her for his own safety. In "She Wants Revenge," it is revealed that she has feelings for James, but her love has been unreciprocated since James fell in love with Elizabeth. In "Battle Royale" it is revealed that Hazel turned James into the police so that they could die together. James is horrified by her confession at a dinner party with The Countess, and he banishes her from his service. 
 Det. Andrew "Andy" Hahn (portrayed by Richard T. Jones) is John's detective partner who is working with him closely on the case of the Ten Commandments Killer. He is initially skeptical about the idea of the murders being connected to the ten commandments, but later sees the connection. His relationship with John strains due to John's gradual descent into insanity. John later reveals to him that he is the Ten Commandments Killer and kills him, as Andy had been going out for coffee with Alex and thus broke the commandment of not coveting another man's wife.
 Scarlett Lowe (portrayed by Shree Crooks and Nicole Lee Tompkins) is the young daughter of John and Alex Lowe, and sister of Holden. After seeing and speaking to Holden at the hotel while visiting her father, she tells her parents. When they don't believe her, she shows them the picture she took with him on her phone, but Holden's face is blurry. Scarlett goes to live with her grandmother when John fires a gun in their house at Bartholomew, but everybody believes he was hallucinating due to John describing it as a "monster." Whilst John and Alex spend time at the hotel, they temporarily abandon her with her grandmother. They later decide to collect her and they plan to begin living as a normal family, but her family return to live in the Cortez deciding it is their true home. For her safety (since she is the only living family member) they decide to send her to a boarding school, where Lachlan is one of her classmates. Following John's death, Scarlett, along with Alex and Holden, visits her father's ghost every year on Devil's Night.
 Holden Lowe (portrayed by Lennon Henry) is the young son of John and Alex Lowe, and brother of Scarlett. In 2010, he is abducted at the Santa Monica amusement park by The Countess and is being raised as one of her vampire children. He resides in the hotel until Alex finds him and decides to bring him home. Alex initially fails to understand his new state of being a vampire and his lack of aging until she discovers him feeding on their pet dog. Holden returns to living in the hotel after The Countess turns Alex. Holden is later collected by Alex and John to continue living live as normal in their old house, but again returns to living in the hotel with his family after deciding it is their true home. Following his father's death, his father's ghost visits him and his family every year on Devil's Night. 
 Tristan Duffy (portrayed by Finn Wittrock) is a male model who appears in the second episode as one of the models in Will Drake's fashion show. He is attracted to The Countess, who infects him with the virus and becomes her new lover. Together, they scheme to kill Will Drake, inherit his money, and live happily. While in Room 64, he is interrupted by James March, who forces him to kill an innocent woman. Later, after killing a man to drink his blood, he joins forces with March. In "Room 33" he falls in love with Liz, and after announcing their love to The Countess, she slits his throat in a rage of jealousy and betrayal, killing him. He then appears in the finale as Liz and Iris attempt to contact his spirit, trapped in the hotel, with the help of Billie Dean Howard. They are unsuccessful, but Tristan's ghost finally appears to Liz after her death, and they can spend eternity together in the hotel.  
 The Addiction Demon (portrayed by Alexander Ward/Mark Steger) is a demonic creature with no facial features and long black nails who wields a drill-bit instrument that he uses to violently sodomize people. He is a living metaphor for addiction. He is seen torturing addicts to punish them for their addiction, one of them being Gabriel. James vows to protect Sally from the demon in exchange for her protecting John from danger, thereby allowing James to continue to use him as a proxy for his Ten Commandment Killings.

Minor characters
 Gabriel (portrayed by Max Greenfield) is a heroin addict who checks into the hotel to use heroin, and ultimately ends up being victim to The Addiction Demon, who savagely rapes him until Sally stops it and sews him into a mattress. Later, he escapes the mattress and mistakes Claudia for Sally and kills her. He dies in the hospital from complications associated with withdrawal after confessing to the murder to John.
 Agnetha (portrayed by Helena Mattsson) is a Swedish tourist who checks into the hotel with her sister Vendela. After discovering a grotesque being sewn into their mattress, Iris traps them in the ballroom and plans to detox their bodies until Sally intervenes. She is successfully detoxed by Iris and the children drink her blood. She later appears as a ghost in the penthouse, and after being given advice to find a purpose, she translates this as encouragement to kill, and she and her sister kill Mr. Wu in his hotel room. Moments later, Alex enlists their help to taunt John out of the hotel. She and Vendela then begin a three-way sexual relationship with Mr. Wu all as ghosts.
 Vendela (portrayed by Kamilla Alnes) is a Swedish tourist and sister of Agnetha. When Sally stops her detox, she releases Vendela who attempts to escape, only to be killed moments later by The Countess in the hotel lobby. She later appears as a ghost in the penthouse, and Donovan advises her to find a purpose. After this translating as encouragement to kill, she kills Mr. Wu in his hotel room, moments before Alex enlists them to taunt John out of the hotel. She and Agnetha then begin a three-way sexual relationship with Mr. Wu all as ghosts.
 Marcy (portrayed by Christine Estabrook) is the busybody realtor who shows Will Drake the Hotel Cortez. She was the same realtor who showed the Harmons the Murder House in the first season of the series. She reveals that in the time since season one, she's had to put down Hallie, the dog originally owned by the Harmons. She checks into the hotel for a business trip and Rudolph and Natacha kill her and drink her blood. She then resides in the hotel as a ghost, and at Liz and Iris's ghost meeting she asks to not be constantly interrupted in her room by the other ghosts so she can spend eternity reading her erotic novels in peace.
 Detective Albano (portrayed by Liana Mendoza) is an LAPD homicide detective.
 Lachlan Drake (portrayed by Lyric Lennon) is Will Drake's son who seems to have intimate knowledge about the hotel. The Countess considers him one of her children despite her killing his father. The Countess plans on infecting him so she may remain his legal guardian and inherit everything his dad left him in his will. He is sent away to a private boarding school following his father's death, where Scarlett Lowe is a classmate.
 Claudia Bankson (portrayed by Naomi Campbell) is the editor of Vogue and close friend of Will Drake, who is later killed by Gabriel after he mistook her for Sally. She now resides in the hotel as a ghost where she mocks Alex in a bloodied form for her poor fashion sense.
 Mrs. Ellison (portrayed by Mädchen Amick) is a West Hollywood anti-vaxxer mother whose son, Max, falls ill with measles. Dr. Alex Lowe is their family doctor and infects Max with the blood virus to save him after Mrs. Ellison is asked if she would like to sign a DNR order. Later, a blood-thirsty Max kills her and her husband and drinks their blood before leaving for school.
 Max Ellison (portrayed by Anton Lee Starkman) is Mrs. Ellison's son. In order to save him from dying, Alex injects him with her blood (which is infected with the blood virus) giving the illusion that he is cured. However, at school, he spreads the measles to his entire class and kills five staff members and drinks their blood along with his classmates. He blames an unidentified man for the deaths, while he and his traveling troop of blood-sucking classmates have been responsible for the killings of several people in order to consume their blood. Alex attempts to convince them that they should come back to her to the hotel and become The Countess's children, but they reject her offer. After Kimmy dies, they change their minds and accept, only to end up trapped in the enclosed hallway with Ramona. It is then discovered in the episode "Battle Royale" that he and the rest of his classmates were killed by Ramona with their dead bodies scattered in the enclosed hallway.
 Dr. Kohan (portrayed by Roxana Brusso) is the Lowes' family psychiatrist who tries to help them move past losing Holden.
 Mr. Samuels (portrayed by David Naughton) is the movie producer who Ramona tried to persuade into casting her into a role. However, she is stopped by The Countess, who instructs Mr. Samuels to leave.
 Aileen Wuornos (portrayed by Lily Rabe) is one of the infamous serial killers that Mr. March invites to the annual Devil's Night soirée. She initially flirts with John at the bar, as he mistakes her for somebody in an Aileen Wuornos costume. After going to John's room, she knocks John unconscious and duct tapes him to a chair so she can kill him, similar to the fashion in which she killed her other victims. However, John breaks free and handcuffs her to the sink. She eventually escapes and apologizes to John about that night and continues to flirt with him at the next Devil's Night. 
 John Wayne Gacy (portrayed by John Carroll Lynch) is one of the infamous serial killers that Mr. March invites to the annual Devil's Night soirée. He annoys James with his nonchalant attitude towards being caught. 
 Jeffrey Dahmer (portrayed by Seth Gabel) is one of the infamous serial killers that Mr. March invites to the annual Devil's Night soirée. After being subject to mockery for being gay by the rest of the table, James gives him a younger man, who is put into a zombie-like trance, similar to what he did to his victims. Dahmer is mentioned by Constance Langdon in Apocalypse while describing Michael Langdon's behavior.
 Richard Ramirez (portrayed by Anthony Ruivivar) is one of the infamous serial killers that Mr. March invited to the annual Devil's Night soirée. Liz gives him an occupied room to break into and kill the Arizona tourists who reside in that room. He kills the husband and chases the wife down the hall, then kills her with the help of Mr. March. Ramirez reappears in 1984, this time played by Zach Villa.
 Craig (portrayed by Nico Evers-Swindell) is a wealthy business man who Sally picks up off of the street to give to Mr. March so he can please his ghostly serial killer dinner guests with the joy of stabbing him to death.
 Justin (portrayed by Darren Criss) is a Silver Lake hipster who seeks refuge in the hotel from pesky trick-or-treaters. Beginning on arrival, Justin and his girlfriend begin making outrageous demands of Iris, including a hotel room at a discount and luxurious foods that Iris is unable to produce, such as a plate of artisanal cheeses, a full-bodied red wine, an organic, non-GMO, grilled romaine, and pâté. When Iris attempts to explain to that she is unable to fulfill his demands, he angrily scolds her and demands their food. After mocking her and insulting the food, Iris kills him in a fit of rage. His body along with his girlfriend's are thrown down the cadaver chute by Iris and Liz Taylor. His ghost is later seen again in the hotel banging on a door demanding kale.
 Bronwyn (portrayed by Jessica Lu) is a Silver Lake hipster who, along with her boyfriend Justin, seeks refuge in the hotel from pesky trick-or-treaters. After making several pesky demands in a rude manner to Iris, and complains about the food in front of her, Iris kills her in a fit of rage. Her body along with Justin's are thrown down the cadaver chute by Iris and Liz Taylor.
 Lieutenant (portrayed by Robert Knepper) is the commander and chief of John's department. In "Room Service," he fires John because of his recent troublesome behavior.
 Mrs. Pritchard (portrayed by Kristen Ariza) is Max Ellison's teacher who Max kills and feasts on her blood.
 Nurse Leena (portrayed by Mouzam Makkar) is the school nurse who takes action to save the school from killing rampage, but is later falls victim to Max and his classmates.
 Charles Montgomery (portrayed by Matt Ross) is the drug-addicted abortionist who lived in the Murder House prior to 1926, continues to reside there as a ghost. The Countess turns to him to abort a baby that was fully developed after three weeks. The abortion fails and the baby survives, killing his nurse.
 Mr. Wu (portrayed by Charles Melton) is the guest of the hotel who is killed in his room by Vendela and Agnetha after having sex with one of them. He later comes back as a ghost and agrees to a three-way sexual relationship with them both as ghosts. 
 Bartholomew is The Countess's only biological child. He was fully developed at three weeks. Worried about what her partner would think, The Countess attempts to have an abortion at the Montgomery Mansion (Murder House) by Charles Montgomery. However, the baby survives the abortion and kills the nurse. He was born infected in 1926, and naturally craves blood. He attacks anyone in sight with the exception of people to whom he shows affection, like his mother and Alex. He is locked in Room 33 in an effort to keep the hotel residents safe.
 Dr. Kaplan (portrayed by David Barrera) is the doctor administering John's psychiatric tests.
 Rudolph Valentino (portrayed by Finn Wittrock) is the famous silent movie star who was involved in a secret polyamorous relationship with Elizabeth and his ex-wife Natacha Rambova, whom he divorced as a publicity stunt. He supposedly dies in 1925, but in reality, he met F. W. Murnau, who convinced him to leave his current life so he may pursue eternal youth. Murnau infects him with the blood virus and returns to his grave to meet a mourning Countess. He infects both Natacha and The Countess with the blood virus. He is kidnapped and enclosed in a hallway with no rooms by James after becoming jealous that The Countess was affectionate toward him. Will Drake accidentally releases him and Natacha from the hallway, where they kill the construction workers, Marcy, and several guests of the hotel, and then leave. Rudolph and The Countess reunite in "She Wants Revenge," in which The Countess promises they will live together forever again now that she has acquired the hotel and Will Drake's fortune. An angry Donovan confronts Rudolph and shoots him several times, mangling his face.
 Natacha Rambova (portrayed by Alexandra Daddario) is the wife of Rudolph Valentino. She had divorced Rudolph in a publicity stunt. She was originally broken up about his death, but found out about his second life prior before The Countess did. She was infected with the same virus and resumed her polyamorous relationship with Rudolph and The Countess. James March, in a fit of jealousy, encloses them in a hallway with no rooms. Will Drake releases them when he opens up the hallway for renovations. They kill the construction workers, Marcy, and several hotel guests before leaving the hotel. After being reunited with The Countess, it is revealed that The Countess only loved her because Rudolph did, but now that their relationship has soured, Rudolph and The Countess plan to leave her. She blames The Countess for locking her away in the hallway, not knowing that it was James who did it. The two get into an argument when Natacha attempts to stab The Countess, but The Countess shoots and kills her.
 F. W. Murnau (portrayed by Henrik Rutgersson) is the director of the vampire film Nosferatu that The Countess and Donovan watched in "Checking In." Originally, he said nothing, and just stared at Rudolph at several different stop along his tour. When Rudolph would blink, he would disappear. One night, he wakes up Rudolph and tells him that movies with sound are beginning to bloom, and he will soon find himself no longer as famous as he once was. However, he said that if Rudolph were to fake his death, he would promise him eternal life. When Rudolph agrees, he infects him with the blood virus he had gotten when he was researching vampires for his film, saying that not all vampires were as gruesome as he portrayed in his film and that some were beautiful.
 Wren (portrayed by Jessica Belkin) is one of The Countess' abducted children. She was taken from an alcoholic father who would leave her in the car while he got drunk at a bar. After James tells Sally that John must continue working for him as the Ten Commandments Killer, Sally enlists the help of Wren to follow John around in the outside world to keep him safe, since Sally is unable to leave the hotel. Wren is accused by Detective Hahn of committing the Ten Commandment Killings because, at Sally's instructions, she was present at the crime scenes. Wren is then locked away in solitary. John releases her when she promises to lead him to the killer, but when John says he will kill the Ten Commandments Killer, it contradicts her mission to protect him, so she runs out in front of a car and kills herself to protect John from knowing the truth.
 Cassie Royale (portrayed by Marla Gibbs) is Ramona Royale's mother. She suffers from cancer, to which she succumbs to in 1992.
 Mr. Royale (portrayed by Henry G. Sanders) is Ramona Royale's father. He suffers from Alzheimer's and refuses to go to the hospital. His condition worsens after his wife's death. He is killed by home invaders, but Ramona revives him by infecting him, causing him to become violent, killing both of the intruders when they break in again. Ramona had hoped his condition would regress, but it remains the same. In order to end his suffering, Ramona drowns him in his bathtub.
 Douglas Pryor (portrayed by Josh Braaten) is Liz's son who he meets at the hotel to make amends. Liz convinces him to start his own company in Boulder and he asks Liz to rejoin his life.

References 

Hotel